Costosa is a genus of moths belonging to the subfamily Olethreutinae of the family Tortricidae.

Species
Costosa allochroma Diakonoff, 1968
Costosa aphenia Diakonoff, 1973
Costosa australis Horak, 2006
Costosa rhodantha (Meyrick, 1907)

See also
List of Tortricidae genera

References

External links
tortricidae.com

Tortricidae genera
Olethreutinae
Taxa named by Alexey Diakonoff